The 59th parallel north is a circle of latitude that is 59 degrees north of the Earth's equatorial plane. It crosses Europe, Asia, the Pacific Ocean, North America, and the Atlantic Ocean.

At this latitude the Sun is visible for 18 hours, 30 minutes during the summer solstice and 6 hours, 11 minutes during the winter solstice.

Around the world
Starting at the Prime Meridian and heading eastwards, the parallel 59° north passes through:

{| class="wikitable plainrowheaders"
! scope="col" width="125" | Co-ordinates
! scope="col" | Country, territory or oceans
! scope="col" | Notes
|-
| style="background:#b0e0e6;" | 
! scope="row" style="background:#b0e0e6;" | Atlantic Ocean
| style="background:#b0e0e6;" | North Sea
|-
| 
! scope="row" | 
| Jæren, Rogaland
|-
| style="background:#b0e0e6;" | 
! scope="row" style="background:#b0e0e6;" | Atlantic Ocean
| style="background:#b0e0e6;" | Byfjorden, Boknafjorden
|-
| 
! scope="row" | 
| Hundvåg and Vassøy Islands, Rogaland
|-
| style="background:#b0e0e6;" | 
! scope="row" style="background:#b0e0e6;" | Atlantic Ocean
| style="background:#b0e0e6;" | Idsefjorden, Boknafjorden
|-
| 
! scope="row" | 
| Rogaland, Vest-Agder, Aust-Agder, Telemark
|-
| style="background:#b0e0e6;" | 
! scope="row" style="background:#b0e0e6;" | Atlantic Ocean
| style="background:#b0e0e6;" | Langesundsfjorden, SkagerrakPassing over Langøya, Geiterøya, Store Arøya and Stokkøya islands
|-
| 
! scope="row" | 
| Vestfold
|-
| style="background:#b0e0e6;" | 
! scope="row" style="background:#b0e0e6;" | Atlantic Ocean
| style="background:#b0e0e6;" | SkagerrakPassing south of Ferder lighthouse and Oslofjorden
|-
| 
! scope="row" | 
| Andholmen and Søndre Sandøy, Hvaler islands, Østfold
|-
| style="background:#b0e0e6;" | 
! scope="row" style="background:#b0e0e6;" | Atlantic Ocean
| style="background:#b0e0e6;" | Sekken sound, Skagerrak for 1.9 km
|-
| 
! scope="row" | 
| Strömstad Municipality, Västra Götaland County for 19 km
|-
| style="background:#b0e0e6;" | 
! scope="row" style="background:#b0e0e6;" | Atlantic Ocean
| style="background:#b0e0e6;" | Iddefjord, Skagerrak for 1 km
|-
| 
! scope="row" | 
| Halden Municipality for 13.6 km
|-
| 
! scope="row" | 
| Västra Götaland County, Lake Vänern, Värmland County, Örebro County, Södermanland County, Stockholm County
|-
| style="background:#b0e0e6;" | 
! scope="row" style="background:#b0e0e6;" | Atlantic Ocean
| style="background:#b0e0e6;" | Baltic Sea
|-
| 
! scope="row" | 
| Island of Hiiumaa
|-
| style="background:#b0e0e6;" | 
! scope="row" style="background:#b0e0e6;" | Atlantic Ocean
| style="background:#b0e0e6;" | Baltic Sea
|-
| 
! scope="row" | 
| Island of Vormsi and the mainland. Passing through Lake Pihkva
|-
| 
! scope="row" | 
| Passing through Rybinsk Reservoir
|-
| style="background:#b0e0e6;" | 
! scope="row" style="background:#b0e0e6;" | Pacific Ocean
| style="background:#b0e0e6;" | Sea of Okhotsk
|-
| 
! scope="row" | 
| Zavyalov Island
|-
| style="background:#b0e0e6;" | 
! scope="row" style="background:#b0e0e6;" | Pacific Ocean
| style="background:#b0e0e6;" | Sea of Okhotsk
|-
| 
! scope="row" | 
|
|-
| style="background:#b0e0e6;" | 
! scope="row" style="background:#b0e0e6;" | Pacific Ocean
| style="background:#b0e0e6;" | Sea of Okhotsk
|-
| 
! scope="row" | 
| Kamchatka Peninsula
|-
| style="background:#b0e0e6;" | 
! scope="row" style="background:#b0e0e6;" | Pacific Ocean
| style="background:#b0e0e6;" | Litke Strait, Bering Sea
|-
| 
! scope="row" | 
| Karaginsky Island
|-
| style="background:#b0e0e6;" | 
! scope="row" style="background:#b0e0e6;" | Pacific Ocean
| style="background:#b0e0e6;" | Bering Sea
|-
| 
! scope="row" | 
| Alaska
|-
| style="background:#b0e0e6;" | 
! scope="row" style="background:#b0e0e6;" | Pacific Ocean
| style="background:#b0e0e6;" | Gulf of Alaska - passing just north of the Barren Islands
|-
| 
! scope="row" | 
| Alaska
|-
| 
! scope="row" | 
| British Columbia - for about 
|-
| 
! scope="row" | 
| Alaska
|-
| 
! scope="row" | 
| British Columbia, Alberta, Saskatchewan, Manitoba (not far north of Churchill).
|-
| style="background:#b0e0e6;" | 
! scope="row" style="background:#b0e0e6;" | Arctic Ocean
| style="background:#b0e0e6;" | Hudson BayPassing just south of the Ottawa Islands, Nunavut, 
|-
| 
! scope="row" | 
| Nunavut, Quebec
|-
| style="background:#b0e0e6;" | 
! scope="row" style="background:#b0e0e6;" | Arctic Ocean
| style="background:#b0e0e6;" | Ungava Bay
|-valign="top"
| 
! scope="row" | 
| Nunavut, Quebec, Newfoundland and Labrador
|-
| style="background:#b0e0e6;" | 
! scope="row" style="background:#b0e0e6;" | Atlantic Ocean
| style="background:#b0e0e6;" |
|-
| 
! scope="row" | 
| Mainland, Orkney, 
|-
| style="background:#b0e0e6;" | 
! scope="row" style="background:#b0e0e6;" | Arctic Ocean
| style="background:#b0e0e6;" | North Sea
|}

See also
58th parallel north
60th parallel north

References

n59